The Hibbert Trust was founded by Robert Hibbert (1769–1849) and originally designated the Anti-Trinitarian Fund. It came into operation in 1853, awarded scholarships and fellowships, supports the Hibbert Lectures, and maintained (from 1894) a chair of ecclesiastical history at Manchester College.

Robert Mortimer Montgomery, who became a member of the Hibbert Trust in 1914, served as its Chairman from 1929 until three weeks before his death, in 1948.

Hibbert Scholars
 R. Travers Herford
 Alexander Gordon

References

External links
The Hibbert Trust

Charities based in Manchester
1853 establishments in the United Kingdom
Educational organisations based in the United Kingdom